"Better as a Memory" is a song written by Scooter Carusoe and Lady Goodman and recorded by American country music artist Kenny Chesney. It was released in March 2008 as the fourth and final single from Chesney's 2007 album  Just Who I Am: Poets & Pirates. With a two-week stay, it became Chesney's fourteenth number one hit on the US Billboard Hot Country Songs chart for the week of June 28, 2008.

Content
The song is a ballad in which the narrator addresses a lover with whom he is splitting with, but most likely warning her he is not the kind to get deeply involved with. He then lists a series of similes regarding himself (such as "built to fade like your favorite song", and "always sure until I doubt"), ultimately telling her that he is "better as a memory / than as [her] man".

The co-writers of the song are both pseudonymous: Scooter Carusoe is a pseudonym for Travis Hill, founder of Carnival Music, and Lady Goodman is a pseudonym of Holly Gleason, Chesney's publicist and a music critic.

Critical reception
Noted Nashville critic Robert K Oermann of Music Row Magazine wrote that "['Better as a Memory'] could be the performance of [Chesney's] life, [and] perhaps his career."

Leeann Ward of Country Universe gave the song a B− grade. She stated that the lyrics seem to be somewhat "self-indulgent" but then said that "the production is nice and Kenny’s vocals are spot on."

Notable Performances
The song was performed with a string quartet on the 2009 Grammy Awards, where Chesney was introduced by Morgan Freeman. Later, it became the final performance in his Sony/Hot Ticket theatrical film "Kenny Chesney: Summer in 3-D."

Popular culture
The tune was voted one of NSAI’s “Ten Songs I Wish I’d Written” in November 2008.

Chart performance

Year-end charts

Certifications

References

2008 singles
2007 songs
Country ballads
2000s ballads
Kenny Chesney songs
Song recordings produced by Buddy Cannon
BNA Records singles
Songs written by Scooter Carusoe